The Selenie Lagoon Archeological Site is a prehistoric archaeological site near Port Graham, Alaska.  The site encompasses a fairly large and deeply-stratified shell midden on the north shore of the Port Graham inlet.  The site is expected to yield a fairly complete sequence of artifacts relating to the history of human habitation of the inlet.

The site was listed on the National Register of Historic Places in 1974.

See also
National Register of Historic Places listings in Kenai Peninsula Borough, Alaska

References

Archaeological sites on the National Register of Historic Places in Alaska
Kenai Peninsula Borough, Alaska
National Register of Historic Places in Kenai Peninsula Borough, Alaska